Lee Cleere (born 1998) is an Irish hurler who plays for Laois Senior Championship club Clough–Ballacolla and at inter-county level with the Laois senior hurling team. He usually lines out as a right corner-back.

Honours

Clough–Ballacolla
Laois Senior Hurling Championship (1): 2015

Laois
Joe McDonagh Cup (1): 2019

References

External links
Lee Cleere profile at the Laois GAA website

1997 births
Living people
Clough-Ballacolla hurlers
Laois inter-county hurlers
Hurling backs